Charaxes psaphon, plain tawny rajah, is a butterfly in the family Nymphalidae. It was described by John Obadiah Westwood in 1847. It is found in the Indomalayan realm.

Subspecies
Charaxes psaphon psaphon (Sri Lanka)
Charaxes psaphon imna Butler, 1870 (India)

Description

References

External links
Charaxes Ochsenheimer, 1816 at Markku Savela's Lepidoptera and Some Other Life Forms

psaphon
Butterflies described in 1847